On 10 July 2018, a suicide bombing occurred at the Awami National Party's workers rally in Yaka Toot area of Peshawar, Khyber Pakhtunkhwa, Pakistan. Haroon Bilour, ANP's candidate for PK-78 and prime target of the attack, was killed as a result of the bombing. The attack left 22 people dead and wounded 75 others. Tehreek-i-Taliban Pakistan claimed responsibility for the attack.

Background

Attacks against ANP leaders 
The leaders of Awami National Party (ANP) have frequently been ambushed by militants. In December 2012, Bashir Ahmad Bilour, leader of ANP and Haroon Bilour's father, was killed by a suicide bomber.

Motive 

The motive behind the assault was to kill the ANP leader Haroon Bilour. Bilour was to contest the next elections from PK-78. On 16 April 2013, a suicide attack claimed by Tehreek-i-Taliban Pakistan (TTP) on ANP election rally that targeted Haroon Bilour, killed 15 people. However, Haroon Bilour was not at the rally.

Bombing 
On late night 10 July 2018, Haroon Bilour arrived at Yakatoot area in Peshawar where ANP workers had gathered for a corner meeting. As his vehicle arrived, a loud explosion occurred. Bilour suffered serious injuries and was shifted to hospital where he succumbed to his wounds.

Aftermath

Rescue services 

Soon after the explosion, the Law enforcement agencies reached the site and initiated investigation. Peshawar's CCPO Qazi Jameel said that nearly 8 kilograms of TNT was used in the bomb.  All the deceased and injured were shifted to Lady Reading Hospital. AIG KPK Shafqat Malik said that a suicide bomber blew himself up and Haroon was the target of the attack. Initially the death toll was 13 but later it rose to 21 according to Lady Reading Hospital officials. The attack also left 75 people wounded. Apart from Bilour, the other 17 deceased were identified as Asif Khan, Mohammad Naeem, Mohammad Shoib, Haji Muhammad Gul, Yaseen, Najeebullah, Khan Muhamad, Huzaifa, Abidullah, Arif Hussain, Imran, AKhtar Gul, Zameer Khan, Asrar, Rizwan, Sadiq and Sameen. Two dead bodies remained unidentified. On 12 July 2018, two days after the attack, another person succumbed to his injuries, bringing the number of deaths to 22.

Bilour's remains  
Bilour's body was shifted to his residence at Bilour House. ANP supporters gathered outside his residence and shouted slogans against government for his "failure to provide security".

PK-78 elections delay 
Following the incident, the Election Commission of Pakistan postponed the polls for PK-78, constituency from which Bilour was to contest election.

Reactions

Security forces 
IG KPK Mohammad Tahir formed a seven-member team to probe the incident and directed it to submit report within 7 days. The following day, police conducted raids across the city. Nine units of Police and Quick Reaction Forces (QRF) were deployed at all entry and exit points of the city.

Perpetrators 
Tehreek-i-Taliban Pakistan (TTP) claimed responsibility for the bombing calling the assassination of Bilour "a revenge of previous government" (referring to 2008-2013 tenure of ANP's KPK governance) and also warned the security forces of more attacks.

Notable victims 
 Haroon Bilour, former Pakistani politician

References 

2018 murders in Pakistan
2018 Pakistani general election 
2018 suicide bombing
21st-century mass murder in Pakistan 
Islamic terrorist incidents in 2018
July 2018 crimes in Asia
July 2018 events in Pakistan
Mass murder in 2018
2018 suicide bombing
Suicide bombings in 2018
2018
Tehrik-i-Taliban Pakistan attacks
Terrorist incidents in Pakistan in 2018
Insurgency in Khyber Pakhtunkhwa